Marc Geujon (born 8 October 1974) is a French classical trumpeter.

Life 
Born in Gonnehem (Pas-de-Calais), Marc Geujon studied trumpet at the music school of Gonnehem with Gilbert Breuvart, at the École Nationale de Musique of Arras in Philippe Vaucoret's class, then at the conservatory of Rueil-Malmaison with Éric Aubier.

First Professor of trumpet at the conservatories of Rueil-Malmaison and Saint-Maur-des-Fossés, Geujon was appointed professor of trumpet at the Conservatoire National Superieur de Musique et de Danse de Paris (CNSMDP).

He is also a chamber musician with the Paris Opera Brass Quintet, David Defiez, Nicolas Vallade and Fabien Wallerand. He regularly performs as a soloist in Europe, Asia and the United States. He also collaborates with the Schilke instrument maker (Chicago-USA), in particular for the Soloiste Serie (Models SC4-MG and SB4-MG).

Selected discography 
 Concertos pour trompette et orchestre de J.Haydn et J.N.Hummel with Paul Kuentz' orchestra, Live Recording
 4 concertos pour Cor de W.A.Mozart with Paul Kuentz's orchestra, Live Recording - Corno da Caccia
Tableaux d’une exposition de Modest Mussorgsky with the Opera de Paris conducted by Philippe Jordan

References

Sources 
  Marc Geujon and the New Schilke ‘Soloiste’

External links 
 Marc Geujon (Opéra national de Paris)
 Personal website
 Discography (Discogs)
 Trumpet Concerto 1st mvt. - Johan Nepomuk Hummel - Marc GEUJON, solo trumpet (YouTube)

1974 births
Living people
People from Pas-de-Calais
Conservatoire de Paris alumni
Academic staff of the Conservatoire de Paris
French classical trumpeters
Male trumpeters
20th-century French musicians
21st-century French musicians
21st-century trumpeters
20th-century French male musicians
21st-century French male musicians
French Republican Guard Band musicians